Brauer or Bräuer is a surname of German origin, meaning "brewer". Notable people with the name include:-

 Alfred Brauer (1894–1985), German-American mathematician, brother of Richard
 Andreas Brauer (born 1973), German film producer
 Arik Brauer (1929–2021), Austrian painter, poet, and actor, father of Timna Brauer
 August Brauer (1863-1917), German zoologist
 Friedrich Moritz Brauer (1832–1904), Austrian entomologist and museum director
 Georg Brauer (1908–2001), German chemist
 Ingrid Arndt-Brauer (born 1961), German politician; member of the Bundestag
 Jono Brauer (born 1981), Australian Olympic skier
 Max Brauer (1887–1973), German politician; First Mayor of Hamburg
 Michael Brauer (contemporary), American audio engineer
 Rich Brauer (born 1954), American politician from Illinois; state legislator since 2003
 Richard Brauer (1901–1977), German-American mathematician
 Richard H. W. Brauer (contemporary), American art museum director; eponym of the Brauer Museum of Art in Valparaiso, Indiana
 Simón Brauer (born 1973), Ecuadorian photographer and cinematographer
 Tage Brauer (1894–1988), Swedish Olympic high jumper
 Timna Brauer (born 1961), Austrian singer and songwriter, daughter of Arik Brauer
 Tiny Brauer (1909–1990), American actor
 Wilfried Brauer (1937–2014), German computer scientist

Bräuer
 Bruno Bräuer (1893–1947), German general officer and paratrooper; executed in Greece for war crimes
 Curt Bräuer (1889–1969), German diplomat; ambassador to Norway at the time of the German invasion

See also

Brasseur
 Brawer
 Breuer
 Brewer
 Brouwer
 Sládek

German-language surnames
Occupational surnames